The 2022 World Running Target Championships were originally scheduled to be held from 20 to 30 September 2021 in Châteauroux, France, but have been postponed until 2022.

Schedule
All times are Central European Summer Time (UTC+2).

Medalists

Men

Women

Medal count

Participants 
A total of 55 shooters from the national teams of the following 14 countries was registered to compete at 2021 World Running Target Championships.

 (6)
 (1)
 (2)
 (6)
 (1)
 (4)
 (8)
 (2)
 (2)
 (1)
 (3)
 (3)
 (4)
 (12)

References

World Running Target Championships
World Championships
2022 in French sport
International sports competitions hosted by France
Shooting competitions in France
World Running Target Championships